The 1925 Brownlow Medal was the second year the award was presented to the player adjudged the fairest and best player during the Victorian Football League (VFL) home and away season. Colin Watson of the St Kilda Football Club won the medal by polling nine votes during the 1925 VFL season.

Leading votegetters

References 

1925 in Australian rules football
1925